Max Haider (21 July 1807 in Biederstein, Schwabing, Munich – 21 June 1873 in Munich) was a German huntsman, draughtsman, lithographer, cartoonist and illustrator.

He married Therese Fäßler (1811–1893), and was the father to landscape painter Karl Haider, and grandfather to painter Ernst Haider.

Haider provided hunting illustrations for the Fliegende Blätter weekly magazine and the Münchener Bilderbogen bi-weekly broadsheet. These illustrations fitted the cultural programme of Maximilian II of Bavaria's belief in reviving regional and national art to awaken a Bavarian national identity, which countered those of his father Ludwig I.

Works by Haider are in the collection of the German Hunting and Fishing Museum in Munich.

Further reading 
 Max Haider: Die Jagd, Braun und Schneider, Munich 1862
Ebnet, Werner; Sie haben in München gelebt: Biografien aus acht Jahrhunderten (They lived in Munich: biographies from eight centuries)  Allitera Verlag (20 July 2016) p. 244.

References

External links

"Haider, Max" in Deutsche Biographie
"Haider, Max", Consortium of European Research Libraries (cerl.org)
"Haider, Max", Virtual International Authority File (VIAF ID: 39651441)

1807 births
1873 deaths
Artists from Munich
19th-century German painters
19th-century German male artists
German male painters